, also Ito Shizu Sen (糸静線) is a major fault on Honshu island that runs from the city of Itoigawa, Niigata Prefecture, through Lake Suwa to the city of Shizuoka in Shizuoka Prefecture.  It is often confused with the Fossa Magna (Great Fissure Zone), a geological feature it forms the western boundary of.

Seismic activity

Recent significant earthquakes on this tectonic line include:
 M5.4; 30 June 2011; epicentre near Matsumoto, Nagano; 1 death, 17 injuries.
 M6.7; 22 November 2014; epicentre near Hakuba, Nagano; 46 injuries.

References

Geology of Japan
Seismic faults of Japan
Geography of Niigata Prefecture
Geography of Shizuoka Prefecture
Geography of Nagano Prefecture